Teen was an American teen and lifestyle magazine for teenage girls. The content of Teen included advice, entertainment news, quizzes, fashion, beauty, celebrity role models, and "real-girl stories". The magazine was published between 1954 and 2009.

Content
The magazine had nine sections: New Stuff, Tech Girl, Celeb Stuff, Celebs, Look, Fashion, Get Real, Absolutely You, and More. New Stuff was a section that talks about anything recently released that is attractive to its readership, such as technology, accessories, clothes, and makeup. The Tech Girl section was specifically about technology, especially "trendy" technology and game reviews.

Celeb Stuff included reviews of movies, television shows, books, and music, young celebrity quotes, celebrity fashion and makeup tips, and a celebrity style quiz, while Celebs was a section that includes celebrity facts, quotes, essays, and predictions, as well as a few posters of teen stars and a quiz.

The Look section concerned beauty articles, such as those concerning hair and makeup. Fashion was a clothing section that talked about knits, jeans, clothes for individual body shapes, crafts, and a quiz.

Get Real consisted of articles written by actual teenagers. The articles included "True Stories from Real Teens", where teens send in their personal essays, "Ask Sophi", an advice column for dating questions, and a quiz. Absolutely You has advice and quizzes about your personal life, crushes, and body. More, at the end of the magazine, included fortune telling, a fictional story, horoscopes, comics, and "Why Me?", a collection of embarrassing stories from readers' real life experiences.

Music
The magazine released Teen Mag Music 2000 Volume 1, a compilation music CD.

Closure
Following the closure of its Cosmogirl in October, Hearst Magazines decided in December 2008 to end publication of Teen magazine. The winter 2009 issue was the last. A spokesperson said “We will continue to publish the annual Teen Prom issue, but will focus our teen publishing efforts on the Seventeen brand.” The spokesperson also noted that teenmag.com would be absorbed into the Hearst Teen Network of sites over the next month.

References

Defunct magazines published in the United States
Hearst Communications publications
Lifestyle magazines published in the United States
Magazines established in 1954
Magazines disestablished in 2009
Magazines published in California
Teen magazines